The Electoral district of Kalkallo is an electoral district of the Victorian Legislative Assembly in Australia. It was created in the redistribution of electoral boundaries in 2021, and will come into effect at the 2022 Victorian state election.

It covers an area in the north western suburbs of Melbourne and outlying northern towns that was previously covered by the districts of Yuroke and Yan Yean. It includes the suburbs of Craigieburn, Mickleham, Kalkallo, and the towns of Beveridge and Wallan.

Members for Kalkallo

Election results

See also

Parliaments of the Australian states and territories
List of members of the Victorian Legislative Assembly

References

Kalkallo, Electoral district of
2022 establishments in Australia
Shire of Mitchell
City of Hume
Electoral districts and divisions of Greater Melbourne